Black Atlantic may refer to:
 The Black Atlantic: Modernity and Double Consciousness 1993 book by Paul Gilroy
 Black Atlantic, 2004 novel in the Judge Dredd series 
 The Black Atlantic (band), Dutch pop band